Rudi in Iran may refer to:
 Rudi, Kerman (رودي)
 Rudi, Sistan and Baluchestan (رودي)
 Rudi, Chabahar (رودي), Sistan and Baluchestan Province
 Rudi-ye Bala, Sistan and Baluchestan Province

See also
 Rudy, Iran